Nyssa High School is a high school located in Nyssa, Oregon, United States. It is in the Nyssa School District.

Academics
In 1985, Nyssa High School was honored in the Blue Ribbon Schools Program, the highest honor a school can receive in the United States.

Demographics
The demographic breakdown of the 326 students enrolled in 2016-17 was:
 Male - 49.1%
 Female - 50.9%
 Native American/Alaskan - 0.6%
 Asian - 0.3%
 Hispanic - 69.0%
 White - 28.2%
 Multiracial - 1.9%

72.4% of the students were eligible for free or reduced-cost lunch.

Notable alumni
 Leo Long, 1954 NCAA champion in the javelin throw

References

External links
 NHS website
 School district website

High schools in Malheur County, Oregon
Public high schools in Oregon
Nyssa, Oregon